The 2020 Taça de Portugal Final was the last match of the 2019–20 Taça de Portugal, which decided the winner of the 80th season of the Taça de Portugal. It was played at the Estádio Cidade de Coimbra in Coimbra, between Benfica and Porto.

It was the 37th final for Benfica in the competition's history after they won the 2017 final, while Porto returned a year later to dispute its 31st final of the Portuguese Cup, after they lost the 2019 final to Sporting CP.

The defending champions were Sporting CP, however, they were knocked out in the third round by third-tier side Alverca.

The final was originally scheduled to take place on 24 May 2020 at the Estádio Nacional venue in Oeiras. However, on 12 March, the Portuguese Football Federation (FPF) announced that it would be postponed due to the COVID-19 pandemic in Portugal, following the recommendations of the government. On 28 April, the Portuguese Prime Minister António Costa reunited with the presidents of the "Big Three" clubs in Portugal (Benfica, Sporting CP, and Porto), the president of the Portuguese Football Federation, and the president of the Liga Portuguesa de Futebol Profissional, to discuss the conditions of the return of football competitions in Portugal. Two days later, with the consent of the Ministry of Health, Costa approved the return of the final, with the match being played behind closed doors. 

On 2 July, it was announced that the final would be played on 1 August at the Estádio Cidade de Coimbra in Coimbra, behind closed doors. The match marked the fifth time the final was played outside of the Estadio Nacional which traditionally held the occasion every year since the 1983 final was played at Porto's former ground, the Estádio das Antas. The match also became the fourth final played at Coimbra after the city hosted it last time 83 years ago at the Campo do Arnado.

Route to the final

Note: H = home fixture, A = away fixture

Match

Details

Notes

References

2020
2019–20 in Portuguese football
S.L. Benfica matches
FC Porto matches
Taça de Portugal Final
August 2020 sports events in Portugal